Joseph Guillemot (1 October 1899 – 9 March 1975) was a French middle- and long-distance runner. He won the 5000 metres and was second in the 10,000 metres at the 1920 Summer Olympics.

Career 
Guillemot's athletics career began while he was serving in World War I. During the war he won the national cross-country championships of the French military. He then returned to the front and fought until the Armistice on 11 November 1918.

During World War I, Guillemot was the victim of an accident that left his right lung permanently damaged by mustard gas. In addition, his heart was located on the right-hand side of his chest. Nevertheless, Guillemot went on to have a successful career in athletics.

In 1920 Guillemot won the French national championship in the 5000 m, which qualified him for the Olympic Games in Antwerp later that year. The favourite for the 5000 m in Antwerp was Paavo Nurmi. In the final of the 5000 m, Nurmi ran at a high pace in the first half of the race as a strategy to exhaust the Swedes Eric Backman and Rudolf Falk. Only Guillemot was able to follow Nurmi's pace. Guillemot passed Nurmi on the last bend to take the victory.

Guillemot then took the silver medal in the 10,000 m behind Nurmi. The final of the 10,000 m was brought forward by three hours at the request of King Albert of Belgium, which Guillemot was only informed of after eating a large lunch. Suffering from stomach cramps and wearing shoes that were two sizes too large (as his own shoes had been stolen), Guillemot finished 1.4 seconds behind Nurmi in second place.

After the 1920 Olympics, Guillemot won three titles in the International Cross Country Championships: one individual title in 1922 and two with the French team in 1922 and 1926. He won the French 5000 m title on three occasions, but missed the 1924 Olympics due to disagreements with the French Athletics Union.

World records 
Guillemot held two world records: 2000 m (5:34.8) and 3000 m (8:42.2).

Death 
Having been a pack a day cigarette smoker, Guillemot died of lung cancer in Oradour-Saint-Genest at the age of 75.

References

External links 

 
 

1899 births
1975 deaths
French male long-distance runners
Olympic athletes of France
Olympic gold medalists for France
Olympic silver medalists for France
Athletes (track and field) at the 1920 Summer Olympics
International Cross Country Championships winners
French military personnel of World War I
Medalists at the 1920 Summer Olympics
Olympic gold medalists in athletics (track and field)
Olympic silver medalists in athletics (track and field)
Deaths from lung cancer in France
Olympic cross country runners
20th-century French people